Delme  “tekky baller” herriman (born 8 May 1973 in Harrogate, England) is a British former professional basketball player.

Herriman, who grew up in Widnes, England, played college basketball in the United States for Wright State University. During a 1995 Midwestern Collegiate Conference quarterfinal game, he made what has been called "the most famous shot in Wright State basketball history", a last-second, game-winning jumper against a ranked Xavier University team. After college, Herriman played in Italy, Belgium, the Netherlands, Germany, France, Austria, and England. Herriman was also part of the England team that claimed the bronze medal in Men’s Basketball at the 2006 Commonwealth Games.
Head Coach of Liverpool Basketball D2 Men's team, 2016 – present.
D2 Coach of the year 2017/18
D2 Coach of the year 2018/19
D2 National Champions undefeated 20–0 (2018/19)
D2 National play-off Champions 2019
Director of Archbishop beck sports college. 
ABL North Coach of the year 2018/19
Undefeated ABL North:10-0  2018/19
National quarter finalists 2019.

Herriman later became a basketball coach. He has completed an autobiography titled Mr. Versatility.

References

1973 births
Living people
Wright State Raiders men's basketball players
Cheshire Jets players
English men's basketball players
Commonwealth Games bronze medallists for England
Mersey Tigers players
Commonwealth Games medallists in basketball
Sportspeople from Widnes
Sportspeople from Harrogate
Basketball players at the 2006 Commonwealth Games
Medallists at the 2006 Commonwealth Games